The University of Puget Sound (UPS or Puget Sound) is a private university in Tacoma, Washington. The university draws approximately 2,600 students from 44 states and 16 countries. It offers 1,200 courses each year in more than 50 traditional and interdisciplinary areas of study. The university is affiliated with the United Methodist Church.

History
The University of Puget Sound was founded by the Methodist Episcopal Church in 1888 in downtown Tacoma. The idea for a college in Tacoma originated with Charles Henry Fowler, who had previously been the president of Northwestern University. Fowler was in Tacoma for a Methodist conference when he spoke of his vision of a Christian institution of learning in the area. The conference released a report:

Two cities vied for the location of the school: Port Townsend and Tacoma. The committee eventually decided on Tacoma. A charter was drawn up and filed in Olympia on March 17, 1888. This date marks the legal beginning of the school. At this time, the school's legal title was "The Puget Sound University". In September 1890, UPS opened its doors, taking in 88 students.

The beginnings of the school were marked by moral conviction: students were warned against intoxicating liquors, visits to saloons, gambling, tobacco use, and obscene drawings or writings on the college grounds. The university also had a financially tumultuous beginning. There was no endowment and the school often struggled for funds to pay the professors. It moved locations three times in 13 years and, at one time, the school was merged with Portland University (former campus is now the University of Portland). It opened up a year later (1899) back in Tacoma on the 9th and G Street. In 1903, the school was "reborn" and re-incorporated as a different entity, different trustees, and a different name: the "University of Puget Sound".

The character of the school changed dramatically during the presidency of Edward H. Todd (1913–1942), who worked tirelessly to bring financial and academic stability. During his tenure, the "Million Dollar Campaign" was started, raising $1,022,723 for buildings, equipment, and endowment. With this money, the campus moved in 1924 to its current location in the residential North End of Tacoma, with five buildings, setting a stylistic tone for the institution. In 1914 the university was renamed the "College of Puget Sound".

President R. Franklin Thompson (1942–1973) led a massive physical and institutional expansion: During this era almost all of the university's buildings were constructed. In 1960, the university's name changed from the "College of Puget Sound" back to the "University of Puget Sound", as it is known today.

Phillip M. Phibbs presided from 1973 to 1992 and endeavored to change the tone of Puget Sound. In 1980, the university divested its attachment with the Methodist Church, and an independent board of trustees assumed full fiscal responsibility of the university. Also during this time, the university began to focus on undergraduate education, phasing out all off-campus programs except the law school and most graduate programs. During this time the library collections were broadened and the faculty greatly expanded.

With the advent of President Susan Resneck Pierce (1992–2003), the law school was promptly sold to Seattle University, in a move that was calculated to focus the university's resources on its undergraduate campus. During her tenure, the university completed almost $100 million of new construction and renovation. Collins Memorial Library and four academic buildings were renovated, and Wyatt Hall was constructed to house the growing class and office space needs of the Humanities Department. Trimble Residence Hall was constructed, bringing on-campus student residency to 65%. SAT scores rose from 1067 to 1253 and the endowment more than tripled.

Puget Sound's president from 2003 to early 2016 was Ronald R. Thomas, affectionately called "Ron Thom" by many students, a scholar of Victorian literature, and the former vice-President of Trinity College.

In February 2016, the university announced the selection of Dr. Isiaah Crawford to be its next president, upon Thomas' retirement. President Crawford assumed office on July 1, 2016.

Thompson Hall, home of the sciences at the university, underwent a major renovation, including the construction of a new wing (Harned Hall, completed 2006) on the building's western side against Union Avenue and extensive renovations to the current wings and courtyard to allow for upgraded labs and facilities. The entire project was completed in mid 2008. The entire complex is now known locally as "The Science Center at Puget Sound." The now completely enclosed courtyard contains a striking Plexiglas structure where a coffee shop, Oppenheimer Cafe, is located.

In fall 2013 Puget Sound opened Thomas Hall, a residence hall for upper-division students featuring 11 "houses" organized around five academic-residential programs: the Humanities Program, environmental outdoor leadership, international experiential learning, entrepreneurship, and the Honors Program. The hall is home for 135 students, and includes a seminar room, four studies, and an event/meeting space for approximately 150 people, accommodating special events, guest lectures, performances and more.

Presidents

Campus

The campus is located in North Tacoma, Washington in a primarily residential setting a few minutes' walk from the Proctor and the Sixth Avenue district.

The campus is made up of mainly brick buildings in the Tudor- Gothic architectural style. Buildings are mostly arranged into quads. The three main quads are the North Quad and South Quad, which contain residence halls, and Karlen Quad, which contains Jones Hall, Collins Memorial Library and the Music Building. The library was designed by Tacoma architect Silas E. Nelsen in 1954. It was later renovated.

President Thomas recently wrote a piece explaining his opinion that new buildings should maintain the gothic style that the university is known for.

Academic buildings
Harned Hall, named for alumnus and local real estate developer H.C. "Joe" Harned, was dedicated on September 29, 2006. It was designed and built to meet the U.S. Green Building Council's LEED Silver Standard. The building features labs for biology, geology, chemistry, environmental science, and physics, a  courtyard with a crystalline glass gazebo in the center, a Foucault pendulum designed by Alan Thorndike, as well as Gray whale skeleton named Willy.

After Harned Hall was completed, the university began a $38 million renovation of Thompson Hall, the "old" science building. Harned and Thompson Halls form a square with a courtyard in the middle, and are collectively named the Science Center. The renovation was completed in spring 2008.

Wyatt Hall is the second newest academic building on campus, dedicated in 2003. It houses the English, History, Foreign Languages & Literature, Politics & Government, Philosophy, Honors, Science Technology & Society, Classics, and Religion departments. Many of the classrooms in the building are seminar style, meaning a circle of tables that students sit at to encourage discussion between students and the professor, rather than a lecture. The building features glass art by Dale Chihuly that represents the ivy leaves covering the campus buildings.

The Wheelock Student Center, known as the "SUB" (Student Union Building) is the main hub of life on campus. It features a rotunda used for lectures and catered events, KUPS (the campus radio station), the cafeteria and dining area, Diversions Cafe (a student-run coffee shop), and The Cellar (a student-run pizza parlor).

Other buildings include McIntyre Hall, home of the School of Business and Leadership, the Departments of Economics, Sociology and Anthropology, and International Political Economy; Howarth Hall, home of the School of Education, Office of Diversity and Inclusion, Career and Employment Services, and more; Jones Hall, home of theatre arts, communication studies, and several administrative offices, including the Office of the President; and the Music Building (which is the only building on campus without a name). Kittredge Hall, the original student union building, now houses the art department and Kittredge Gallery. The Gallery is now affiliated with Tacoma Art Museum.

Collins Memorial Library houses over 400,000 books and over 130,000 periodicals, is a partial federal government repository, and has substantial microform holdings. The Library was named after former trustee Everill S. Collins. The current Library building was built in 1954. A larger addition was completed in 1974. In 2000, a major renovation brought new technology and media resources into the Library's spaces, making it one of the most popular campus gathering places for students.

Construction for the William T. and Gail T. Weyerhaeuser Center for Health Sciences began in spring 2010. At , the center provides the resources and flexibility needed to support new areas of study in the fields of health and behavioral sciences. Specially designed to encourage cross-disciplinary interaction, the center houses Puget Sound's undergraduate departments in exercise science and psychology, graduate programs in occupational and physical therapy, and interdisciplinary program in neuroscience. Designed by Bohlin Cywinski Jackson/Seattle, Weyerhaeuser Hall conforms to the U.S. Green Building Council's Leadership in Energy and Environmental Design (LEED) Silver standards.

Residential buildings

Harrington, Schiff, Anderson/Langdon, Smith, and Oppenheimer halls make up what is called the "North Quad", and Todd/Phibbs, Regester, Seward, Trimble, and Thomas Hall make up the "South Quad." Theme Row, which runs to the south end of campus, contains around 20 different theme houses that students may apply to live in. The Music House is the longest standing house, originating in 1989. After the Music House, the Outhaus and the Track and Cross Country Theme House are the two longest standing houses. There are also about 55 non-theme university-owned houses available.

Currently around 65% of students live on campus. Students are required to live on campus for their first two years of enrollment at the university.

In 2009, the university upgraded residential Internet bandwidth by more than two-fold, to 100 Mbit/s. During that year, a new connection to the Washington State K-20 Educational Network was also installed, bringing the university's aggregate bandwidth to 150 Mbit/s. Further bandwidth upgrades have brought student bandwidth to 250 Mbit/s for the 2012-13 academic year.

Academics
The university offers more than 50 traditional and nontraditional areas of study in the liberal arts and sciences, as well as graduate programs in occupational therapy, physical therapy, education and most recently launched Master of Public Health Program. The student to faculty ratio is 12 to 1.

Rankings and reputation

In 2012 Puget Sound was named one of 40 schools nationwide in the college guide Colleges That Change Lives: 40 Schools That Will Change the Way You Think About Colleges. The guide cites the college's dynamic curriculum, close interaction between students and professors, ideal location, and enduring success of its alumni as qualities that set it apart from other schools.

The university has ranked among the top five small liberal arts colleges for the number of graduates who participate in Peace Corps; in 2007, it ranked first.

Puget Sound professors have been named Washington State Professor of the Year seven times by the Carnegie Foundation for the Advancement of Teaching and the Council for the Advancement and Support of Education.

Admissions
For the Class of 2022 (enrolling fall 2018), University of Puget Sound received 5,730 applications, admitted 5,060 (88.3%), and enrolled 653 students. For the freshmen who enrolled, the middle 50% range of SAT scores was 1130-1350, the ACT Composite range was 25–30, and the average high school grade point average was 3.50.

International programs
The university sponsors study abroad programs in Argentina, Australia, Austria, Chile, China, Costa Rica, Denmark, England, France, Germany, Greece, Ireland, Italy, Japan, the Netherlands, New Zealand, the Pacific Rim, Scotland, Spain, Taiwan, and Wales.

The program in the Pacific Rim, known as PacRim, or the Pacific Rim/Asia Study-Travel Program (PRAST) is unique to Puget Sound. Every three years a group of 15-25 students are selected to spend two semesters traveling, studying, and researching in eight Asian countries. Students must have taken three courses in the Asian Studies program and completed a course of readings assigned by the director. Over the program's 40-year history students have visited: Mongolia, People's Republic of China, Japan, South Korea, India, Nepal, Vietnam, Thailand, Cambodia, Malaysia, Sri Lanka, Indonesia, Papua New Guinea, Fiji, Australia, New Zealand, Iran, and Yugoslavia. Previous lecturers have included: Johan Galtung, Ken Yeang, Dr. M.S. Nagaraja Rao, Jack Weatherford, the 14th Dalai Lama, Swasti Sri Charukeerthi Bhattaraka, Ogyen Trinley Dorje, Khyongla Rato Rinpoche, and Sogyal Rinpoche.

Tuition and finances
For 2015-16 the cost of attendance (tuition, room, board, and fees) is $56,456. Approximately 90% of all students receive some form of financial aid. All students are considered for Alumni, Faculty, Dean's, President's, or Trustee scholarships, which range from $5,000 to $30,000. No extra application is required to be considered for these scholarships.

Additional scholarships are available through separate applications or by audition. Puget Sound offers scholarships for music, forensics (speech and debate), art, and other talents. Scholarships based on academic interest—such as the sciences, humanities, and Asian studies—are offered as well.

Four full-ride scholarships are provided to four incoming students by the university every year. Two students are awarded the Lillis Scholarship, which focuses on "academic passion and achievement", and two students are awarded the Matelich Scholarship, which honors leadership skills.

Athletics

The Puget Sound athletics teams are known as the "Loggers" with "Grizz the Logger" as their mascot. The Loggers participate in the NCAA's Division III Northwest Conference, competing with George Fox University, Lewis and Clark College, Linfield College, Pacific University, Pacific Lutheran University, Whitman College, Whitworth University, and Willamette University.

Varsity sports
The University offers 23 different varsity sports teams: Men's Baseball, Men's and Women's Basketball, Men's and Women's Crew, Men's and Women's Cross Country, Men's Football, Men's and Women's Golf, Women's Lacrosse, Men's and Women's Soccer, Women's Softball, Men's and Women's Swimming, Men's and Women's Tennis, Men's and Women's Indoor and Outdoor Track & Field, and Women's Volleyball. On a minor note, former national soccer team coach Bruce Arena got his coaching start at Puget Sound in 1976 as head of the men's soccer team.

Club sports

There are both men's and women's club soccer teams, as well as men's club lacrosse (which competes in the Pacific Northwest Collegiate Lacrosse League). The university also has a men's club Ultimate team known as the "Postmen", and a women's club Ultimate team known as "Clear Cut".

The university is well known for its successful men's rugby club. The club has achieved regional and national success over the past three seasons under coach Mark Sullivan. In 2012 the club was ranked 10th in the nation for small college rugby and traveled to Cal Maritime University in Vallejo, California for the regional tournament. The success of the men's rugby club is attributed to the hard work of the players and continual dedication of their coaches. Also, an intense rivalry has developed between the UPS rugby club and the Seattle University rugby club. Known as the Seatac Cup, UPS has achieved eight straight victories over their rivals. In 2012, the victory over Seattle University clinched the Loggers' playoff spot.

The UPS Loggers hockey team was founded in 2005 and is currently an ACHA division II team. The team's most prominent victories include defeating the University of Washington Huskies in a 3-game series in the 2006-2007 season, and the Gonzaga Bulldogs in the 2007-2008 season. Loggers hockey is subsidized by ASUPS (the Associated Students of UPS) student body and ticket sales for home games. Home games are currently played at the Sprinker Ice Arena in south Tacoma. Players come from the student body, and mostly consist of students hailing from Canada, Washington, Colorado, Minnesota, and states on the East Coast.

Achievements

Several sports teams have achieved some degree of success in recent years:
The men's basketball team won three straight Northwest Conference championships beginning in 2004, with an average .826 winning percentage over the 2004, 2005, and 2006 seasons. In 2005, the Division III Loggers defeated the Division I Highlanders of the University of California, Riverside, making it their first Division I defeat since the 1970s. In the 2009 regular season, the Loggers went an undefeated 16-0 in Northwest Conference play, becoming the first team in conference history to do so, capturing the conference title in the process.
From 1992 to 1995 the UPS women's Cross-Country team were national champions. This tremendous 4-year run earned coach Sam Ring coach of the year honors in 1993.
The women's soccer team took second place in the nation in 2004 and ended the 2005 season ranked fifth nationally.
The women's swim team won the Northwest Conference championship for eleven consecutive years, from 1997 through 2007, before finally finishing second to Whitworth University in 2008. This remains a Northwest Conference record. The Logger women reclaimed their title in 2009.
The women's basketball team made the Division III Elite 8 in the 2007 season after upsetting #12 ranked McMurry University and #2 ranked Howard Payne University. They finished #10 overall.
The women's crew has earned a bid to compete at the Division III Rowing Championship every year since 2003. The team placed second overall in 2003 and third in 2008, as well as fourth in 2004, 2005, and 2007.

Student life

Traditions and events
In 2013 Puget Sound celebrated its 125th anniversary with a series of special events, anniversary programs, and shared memories by Loggers past and present. Celebrating the milestone of 125 years in the community, Tacoma Mayor Marilyn Strickland declared March 17, 2013, to be "University of Puget Sound Day."

LogJam! is a campuswide celebration that ends the first week of fall classes. Tables are set around the perimeter of Todd Field and the Event Lawn, and clubs and teams set up to recruit potential members.

Foolish Pleasures is an annual student film festival showing films written, directed, acted, and produced by students.

The Hatchet
The Hatchet is the official symbol of sports teams at the University of Puget Sound. It was first discovered in 1906 when students were digging up a barn at the old campus. They decided to carve their class year into it. This became a tradition of sorts, as the seniors would hand the hatchet to the juniors on senior recognition day. This turned into a competition where each class would try to possess the hatchet for as long as possible. It disappeared for 15 years until it was anonymously mailed to former President R. Franklin Thompson. Thompson displayed it in a trophy case in Jones Hall, where it mysteriously disappeared again, only to resurface at a homecoming game in 1988. In 1998, the hatchet's return was negotiated through an intermediary, and it was permanently displayed in a display case in the Wheelock Student Center. It was stolen in 1999 during a false fire alarm in one of the dormitories.

On September 30, 2006 (homecoming) a student rappelled into the football field at halftime, brandishing "the hatchet". It was later revealed by the student newspaper The Trail that this hatchet is a replica of the actual hatchet, commissioned by the former student government administration without the knowledge of the student senate. The replica hatchet was painstakingly carved to look exactly like the original, using over 150 photos as a guide.

The original hatchet was finally returned to President Ronald Thomas in 2008 by two anonymous alumni and was displayed at Homecoming.

Sustainability

The campus has a notable recent history of sustainability. On February 10, 2005, President Ronald R. Thomas signed the Talloires Declaration, committing the University to certain standards regarding sustainability. The Sustainability Advisory Committee, consisting of one faculty co-chair, one staff co-chair, and a mix of faculty, staff and student volunteers, organizes the majority of sustainability efforts on campus. These efforts have included:

Fair trade coffee: The student-run Diversions Café serves only organically-grown, fair trade coffee. In 2005,  of coffee was consumed by students, faculty, and the campus community. University of Puget Sound was the first college in the Northwest to offer fair trade coffee exclusively.
Sustainable Move-Out: Starting in 2005, the University organized a sustainable move-out program during finals week. Mixed-material recycling dumpsters were placed near all residence halls, allowing students to recycle rather than simply throwing all unwanted items away.
Sustainability Mugs: Upon entering the college in 2005, all students were presented with a "sustainability mug" imprinted with the UPS logo. Students were encouraged to re-use the mug to get coffee instead of using paper cups.
No-Waste Picnic: A 2005 picnic welcoming incoming freshmen and their families to the campus produced a surprising ONE bag of trash for over 1700 people. This was accomplished by using recyclable paper and plastic products.

In 2007, President Thomas signed the American College and University Presidents Climate Commitment on behalf of the university.

Fraternities and sororities

UPS is home to four fraternities and five sororities. 20% of male students and 29% of female students are involved in Greek life. Represented fraternities include, Phi Delta Theta (1848/1952), Sigma Chi (1855/1950), and recently reinstated Sigma Alpha Epsilon (1856/2010) and Beta Theta Pi (1839/2013). Represented sororities and women's fraternities include Pi Beta Phi (1867), Kappa Alpha Theta (1870), Alpha Phi (1872), Gamma Phi Beta (1874), and Delta Delta Delta (1888).
Puget Sound has a "deferred recruitment", which means that fraternities, sororities, and their members are not allowed to have any official contact with freshmen outside of class, athletics or club activities until the organized recruitment events in the first two weeks of the spring semester. Freshmen may not join a chapter until January. In the fall, chapters are permitted to give "snap bids" to upperclassmen, as well as participate in an organized fall recruitment open only to upperclassmen. A ceremony called "Crossover" took place annually on the third weekend of spring semester. Members of the Greek community partake in an entire day of celebration to honor the new members as they run across the field to their selected fraternity.

The university is one of just five independent colleges in the Northwest granted a charter by Phi Beta Kappa, which claims to be the nation's most prestigious academic honor society.

Previously, several other organizations, including Sigma Nu, Theta Chi, Kappa Sigma, Chi Omega, and Kappa Kappa Gamma were represented on campus, however those chapters have all closed for a variety of reasons.

Media
KUPS 90.1FM (The Sound) is a student-run, non-commercial, educational college radio station that began in 1968. In 2002, KUPS began streaming its standard live programming online to the world. The radio station broadcasts 24 hours a day, 7 days a week and serves the greater Tacoma area with programming in a variety of genres. KUPS has earned various awards while broadcasting over the years. In 2005, KUPS was named by The Princeton Review as one of the best college radio stations in the country (#12). In 2007, KUPS was ranked #9 by the Princeton Review in the Top Ten Best College Radio Stations in the Country. Most recently, in the spring of 2010, MTV honored KUPS with the national title of Best College Radio Station at the MTVu Woodie Awards. In the fall of 2011, KUPS was ranked third in a list of "10 great college radio stations" in the Washington Post.

The Trail is an independent student-run organization that provides Puget Sound students, faculty, staff, and the local community with a credible weekly newspaper that serves as a comprehensive source of information, entertainment and discourse relevant to its readership. The Trail provides opportunities for students interested in journalism and acts as an archival record for the university. In addition, The Trail serves as a link between Puget Sound and the greater Tacoma community and provides an open forum for student opinion and discourse within the university.

"Crosscurrents" is the school's literary and arts magazine and was established in 1957. Crosscurrents is published two times during the academic year, once during the Fall semester and once during the Spring semester. Magazines are free to the campus community. It is staffed by students and publishes student artwork, photography, prose, poetry, and the occasional miscellaneous piece. Crosscurrents also features a guest artist or writer in each issue- usually a notable person from the pacific northwest who is interviewed about their work.

"Wetlands" is a recent student-organized magazine focusing on sexual exploration and gender expression to encourage inclusive and open-minded conversations across the campus community. The magazine features community-submitted photography, poetry, and prose.

"Elements" is the school's student-run science magazine. Published twice during the academic year, Elements primarily contains student articles about science, research, math, the environment, and technology, as well as student artwork. Copies of Elements are free and are distributed at the end of Fall semester and Spring semester.

"Black Ice" (or the Black Student Union Zine) is a student magazine by the focused on issues for the betterment of all students of color. The magazine is published by The Black Student Union, which was founded in 1968 making it one of the university's oldest clubs.

Notable alumni
 Suzanne Anderson (1979), Professor of Geophysics
Kiʻilani Arruda (2024), Miss Teen USA 2020
Bill Baarsma (1964), mayor of Tacoma, 2002–2009
 Scott Bateman (1986), nationally syndicated cartoonist
 Ted Bundy (non-degreed alumnus), serial killer
 Jose Calugas (1961), Medal of Honor recipient
 William Canfield (1976; 2008) glycobiologist who developed an enzyme that can stabilize Pompe disease.
 Terry Castle (1975), Professor of English, Stanford University
 Dale Chihuly (non-degreed alumnus), glass artist
 Jori Chisholm (1997), Champion bagpiper
Kai Correa, Major League Baseball coach for the San Francisco Giants
 Greg Craven, climate change activist who produced a viral video on YouTube
 Helen Engle (née Harris), an American conservationist and activist
 Gretchen Fraser (1941), gold medalist, slalom, 1948 Winter Olympics
 Scott Griffin (MBA 1982), CIO of Boeing
 Marion Higgins (1897), supercentenarian who died at age 112 and was briefly the oldest California resident
 Bayard Johnson, screenwriter (The Second Jungle Book: Mowgli & Baloo, Tarzan and the Lost City)
 Edward LaChapelle (1949), avalanche researcher and glaciologist
 Judy MacLeod, commissioner of Conference USA intercollegiate athletic conference
 Rachel Martin (1996), Host, NPR's Weekend Edition Sunday
 Colleen Moffitt (1991), co-founder of Communique Public Relations and author of "Strategic Public Relations: 10 Principles to Harness the Power of PR".
 Charlie Lowery, NBA player
Rochelle Nguyen, attorney and member of the Nevada Assembly
T'wina Nobles, educator and member-elect of the Washington State Senate
Mary O´Malley, (1945), author.
 George Obiozor (1969), Nigerian Ambassador to the U.S.
 Mike Oliphant (1988), professional (NFL) football player
 Sean Parnell (JD; 1987), Governor of Alaska
 Chris Pirih (1987), creator of SkiFree, one of the seminal computer games in the early days of Microsoft Windows
 Mike Price (1969), head football coach at Washington State University and the University of Texas at El Paso
 Christine Quinn-Brintnall (JD; 1980), Washington state Court of Appeals judge
 Debbie Regala, former member of the Washington State Legislature
Roald Reitan, Metropolitan Opera star
 Ross Shafer (1975) comedian and motivational speaker
 Darby Stanchfield (1993), television actress (Mad Men and Scandal)
 Rick Steves (non-degree alum), producer of the popular Rick Steves' tour guidebook series as well as "Rick Steve's Europe" on PBS. Attended Puget Sound for only one semester.
 Jeff Smith (1967), TV Chef, "The Frugal Gourmet"
 Brian Sonntag (non-degreed alumnus), Washington State Auditor
 Hari Sreenivasan (1995), correspondent for the NewsHour with Jim Lehrer
Max Vekich, former member of the Washington House of Representatives and labor leader
 Adam West (non-degree alumnus), actor most notably portraying Batman. Transferred to Whitman College
 Lael Wilcox, ultra-distance cyclist
 Milt Woodard (1933), sports executive, co-founder of American Football League
 Bang Wong (1994), creative director of the Broad Institute at MIT and Harvard University

References

External links

 
 Official athletics website

 
North Tacoma, Washington
University of Puget Sound
Educational institutions established in 1888
Universities and colleges accredited by the Northwest Commission on Colleges and Universities
Universities and colleges in Tacoma, Washington
1888 establishments in Washington Territory